The polong is a type of familiar spirit in Malay folklore. It has the appearance of a miniature woman, the size of the first joint of the finger.

The polong is one of the ghosts mentioned in Hikayat Abdullah, written by Abdullah bin Abdul Kadir, much to the amusement of Sir Thomas Stamford Bingley Raffles, his employer.

Creation
A polong is created from the blood of a murdered man kept in a type of spherical bottle with a narrow neck. Over a period of one to two weeks, incantations are said over the bottle. When the period is over, the blood becomes a polong. It refers to its owner as its mother or father. The polong is hidden outside the owner's house when not in use.

Task
The polong is sent to attack a victim against whom either the owner themselves or someone who paid the owner bears ill-will against. The polong is always preceded by its pet or plaything, the grasshopper-like pelesit. The pelesit enters the victim's mouth and begins to chirp. The polong follows and possesses the victim, causing them to go insane until exorcised. A polong victim froths at the mouth, tears at their own clothes, and attacks anyone nearby.

As per some sources, people who have been attacked by polong are left with bruises, a few markings and almost always have blood coming out of their mouths.

Weaknesses
Unless called off by its owner, a polong victim can only be cured through exorcism by a shaman (dukun or bomoh). The method of exorcism is to ask the polong who is its parent (meaning its owner). The polong replies through the possessed person in a falsetto voice, revealing the name and village of its owner. The polong will often resist, either by making the afflicted victim attack the shaman, or by falsely accusing someone else.

In popular culture
 In Marvel Anime: Blade, a Polong appears in episode 7. It is depicted as a vampire creature that obeys whoever gives it their blood.

See also
 Hantu Raya
 Pelesit
 Penanggalan
 Toyol

References

 Vampires: A Field Guide to the Creatures That Stalk the Night, By Bob Curran, Published by Career Press, 2005, 222 pages - Google books.

External links
 An Introduction to Malaysian Ghouls & Vampires

Malay ghost myth
Malaysian mythology
Animism in Asia
Malay words and phrases
Jinn
Asian shamanism
Mythological hematophages
Jinniyyat